Hellesdon High School is a secondary school and sixth form with academy status in Hellesdon, Norfolk, England. The school is part of the Wensum Trust. The headmaster duties are shared between Tom Rolfe & Mike Earl. The school incorporates 1,500 pupils including 300 in the Sixth Form Centre. Previously the school shared a sixth form provision with Taverham High School, but this was phased out in September 2014.

Notable staff and pupils
Lionel Fanthorpe, television presenter, author and lecturer; Head of English and then Deputy Headteacher at the school 1972–1979
Sam Sexton, professional boxer 
Chris Sutton, footballer; pupil at the school from 1986
Mike Sutton, footballer

References

Secondary schools in Norfolk
Academies in Norfolk